Ozyorsky (masculine), Ozyorskaya (feminine), or Ozyorskoye (neuter), alternatively spelled Ozersky, Ozerskaya, or Ozerskoye, is the name of several rural localities in Russia:
Ozersky, Kursk Oblast, a settlement under the administrative jurisdiction of  the work settlement of  Kirovsky,  Pristensky District, Kursk Oblast
Ozersky, Verkhnedonskoy District, Rostov Oblast, a khutor in Tubyanskoye Rural Settlement of Verkhnedonskoy District of Rostov Oblast
Ozersky, Zimovnikovsky District, Rostov Oblast, a khutor in Verkhneserebryakovskoye Rural Settlement of Zimovnikovsky District of Rostov Oblast
Ozerskoye, Kaluga Oblast, a selo in Kozelsky District of Kaluga Oblast
Ozyorskoye, Leningrad Oblast, a logging depot settlement under the administrative jurisdiction of Kamennogorskoye Settlement Municipal Formation, Vyborgsky District, Leningrad Oblast
Ozerskoye, Moscow Oblast, a village in Kvashenkovskoye Rural Settlement of Taldomsky District of Moscow Oblast
Ozerskoye, Nizhny Novgorod Oblast, a village in Nakhratovsky Selsoviet of Voskresensky District of Nizhny Novgorod Oblast
Ozyorskoye, Sakhalin Oblast, a selo in Korsakovsky District of Sakhalin Oblast
Ozerskaya, Kaluga Oblast, a village in Zhizdrinsky District of Kaluga Oblast
Ozerskaya, Kirov Oblast, a village under the administrative jurisdiction of the town of Luza, Luzsky District, Kirov Oblast

See also
Ozerskoy, a railway crossing loop in Zhizdrinsky District of Kaluga Oblast